Enitsa Peak is the sharp rocky peak rising to 2816 m on the side ridge that trends 9.15 km northeastwards from Mount Giovinetto on the main crest of north-central Sentinel Range in Ellsworth Mountains, Antarctica.  It surmounts Rumyana Glacier to the southeast and Delyo Glacier to the northwest.

The peak is named after the settlement of Enitsa in Northern Bulgaria.

Location
US mapping in 1961 and 1988.

See also
 Mountains in Antarctica

Maps
 Vinson Massif.  Scale 1:250 000 topographic map.  Reston, Virginia: US Geological Survey, 1988.
 Antarctic Digital Database (ADD). Scale 1:250000 topographic map of Antarctica. Scientific Committee on Antarctic Research (SCAR). Since 1993, regularly updated.

Notes

References
 Enitsa Peak. SCAR Composite Gazetteer of Antarctica.
 Bulgarian Antarctic Gazetteer. Antarctic Place-names Commission. (details in Bulgarian, basic data in English)

External links
 Enitsa Peak. Copernix satellite image

Ellsworth Mountains
Bulgaria and the Antarctic
Mountains of Ellsworth Land